Lyonia truncata is a species of flowering plant in the family Ericaceae known as Dominican staggerbush.

One variety, Lyonia truncata var. proctorii, or Proctor's staggerbush, is a rare plant endemic to Puerto Rico. It is federally listed as an endangered species by the United States government.

References

External links
USDA Plants Profile

truncata